Coralie is a rural locality in the Shire of Croydon, Queensland, Australia.

References 

Shire of Croydon
Localities in Queensland